Rhytiphora mjoebergi is a species of beetle in the family Cerambycidae. It was described by Per Olof Christopher Aurivillius in 1917, originally under the genus Platyomopsis. It is known from Australia.

References

mjoebergi
Beetles described in 1917